The Basilica of Saint Clare (Basilica di Santa Chiara in Italian) is a church in Assisi, central Italy. It is dedicated to and contains the remains of Saint Clare of Assisi, a follower of Saint Francis of Assisi and founder of the Order of Poor Ladies, known today as the Order of Saint Clare.

Construction 
Construction of the church began under the direction of Filippo Campello, one of the foremost architects of the time. On 3 October 1260, Clare's remains were transferred from the chapel of San Giorgio to the Basilica of Saint Clare where they were buried in the earth under the high altar of the new church. The duomo has a superb Romanesque facade.

Discovery of remains 
Having remained, like the body of St. Francis himself, hidden for six centuries, Clare's tomb was found in 1850 after a prolonged search. On 23 September that year, the coffin was unearthed and opened. The flesh and clothing of the saint had been reduced to dust, but the skeleton was perfectly preserved. Finally, on 29 September 1872, the saint's bones were transferred, with much pomp, by Archbishop Pecci (later Pope Leo XIII), to a shrine in the crypt of the Basilica of Saint Clare that had been erected to receive them. It is here that they may now be seen. The feast of St. Clare is celebrated throughout the Church on 11 August. The feast of her first translation is kept in the order on 3 October, and that of the finding of her body on 23 September.

Saint Agnes of Assisi is also buried here.

Notes

Chiara d'Assisi
Chiara
Churches completed in 1260
Roman Catholic shrines in Italy
Chiara d'Assisi
Minor basilicas in Umbria